Out of the Races and Onto the Tracks is the debut EP by American rock band The Rapture. It was released on May 21, 2001, through Sub Pop, and produced by Tim Goldsworthy and James Murphy. The title track was featured in the film The Rules of Attraction.

Track listing

References

2001 debut EPs
The Rapture (band) albums
Sub Pop EPs
Albums produced by James Murphy (electronic musician)